Cattleya guttata ("the spotted Cattley orchid") is a bifoliate Cattleya species of orchid.  The diploid chromosome number of C. guttata has been determined as 2n = 40.

References

External links

guttata
guttata